Jim Tozzi is an American lobbyist, currently the head of the Center for Regulatory Effectiveness, an industry-supported, for-profit lobbying organization that describes itself as a "regulatory watchdog." Formerly, he was a regulatory official of the United States Office of Management and Budget (OMB).  His partner for many years was Thorne G. Auchter and they ran two main lobbying organisations, Federal Focus and Multinational Business Services'''.

These two lobbying operations worked for both the chemical and the tobacco industries for many years.  Philip Morris renewed their request for a tax-free gift of $200,000 each year.

Career
Tozzi was instrumental in the passage of the Paperwork Reduction Act and the establishment of the OMB's Office of Information and Regulatory Affairs in 1980. Under his directorship, the Office of Information and Regulatory Affairs was the gatekeeper for virtually all proposed regulations dealing with public health and safety.

Tozzi was the Deputy Administrator of OMB in charge of the OIRA (and therefore of the regulatory agencies) when he left the organization in 1983 at age 45.

Tozzi's role in the DQA was analyzed as a case study in policy entrepreneurship in a National Science Foundation-funded study, "Lobbying and Policymaking: The Public Pursuit of Private Interests", by R. Kenneth Godwin, Scott Ainsworth and Erik K. Godwin.  The article "Policy Entrepreneurs: The Power of Audacity" published by RegBlog, an online publication of the University of Pennsylvania Law School, discussed Tozzi's work on both the PRA and the DQA as examples of policy entrepreneurship.

Personal life
Tozzi resides in Alexandria, Virginia with his main office in Dupont Circle in Washington, DC.  He is currently working on many projects, including nationwide medical marijuana legalization.

References

External links
The Center for Regulatory Effectiveness, firm website
"'Data Quality' Law Is Nemesis Of Regulation", by Rick Weiss, Washington Post, August 16, 2004.
National Archives Interview on Centralized Regulatory Review

American lobbyists
Living people
Year of birth missing (living people)